p-Cymene is a naturally occurring aromatic organic compound.  It is classified as an alkylbenzene related to a monoterpene.  Its structure consists of a benzene ring para-substituted with a methyl group and an isopropyl group. p-Cymene is insoluble in water, but miscible with organic solvents.

Isomers and production
In addition to p-cymene, two less common geometric isomers are o-cymene, in which the alkyl groups are ortho-substituted, and m-cymene, in which they are meta-substituted. p-Cymene is the only natural isomer, as expected from the terpene rule. All three isomers form the group of cymenes. 

Cymene is also produced by alkylation of toluene with propylene.

Related compounds
It is a constituent of a number of essential oils, most commonly the oil of cumin and thyme. Significant amounts are formed in sulfite pulping process from the wood terpenes.

p-Cymene is a common ligand for ruthenium. The parent compound is [(η6-cymene)RuCl2]2.  This half-sandwich compound is prepared by the reaction of ruthenium trichloride with the terpene α-phellandrene. The osmium complex is also known.

Hydrogenation gives the saturated derivative p-menthane.

References 

Flavors
Alkylbenzenes
C4-Benzenes
Monoterpenes
Isopropyl compounds